"Love over Gold" is a song by British rock band Dire Straits. It's the fourth track and title track from the eponymous 1982 album. A shorter live version of the song, taken from the album Alchemy: Dire Straits Live, was released as a single.

Meaning and structure
The protagonist of the text is a fragile, inconsistent and standoffish female figure. Musically, the song has an elegant jazz-influenced arrangement, built around the dialogue between Knopfler's guitar and the Mike Mainieri's vibraphone. Rolling Stone describes "Love over Gold" as "a whispery ballad that plays the jazzy tingle of vibes against an almost classical piano air and the violinlike pluck of a synthesizer to heighten its images of a casual, even cavalier, sex life."

Success and other releases
"Love over Gold" was a moderate hit; it reached its highest position in France (#15), while peaking at #29 in New Zealand, #43 in Netherlands and #50 in the band's native United Kingdom. The live version of the song was included on the 1998 compilation Sultans of Swing: The Very Best of Dire Straits, while the original album version was included on the 2005 compilation Private Investigations: The Best of Dire Straits & Mark Knopfler.

References

Dire Straits songs
1982 songs
Songs written by Mark Knopfler